Candy Yaghjian Waites (born 1943) is an American former politician.

Candy Yaghjian Waites was born in 1943 to Armenian-American painter . Her mother was of Scottish descent. The family moved from New York City to Columbia, South Carolina, in the mid-1940s, when Edmund Yaghjian left the Art Students League of New York for a position at the University of South Carolina. Candy Yaghjian attended Wheaton College. During the 1964 presidential election, the student body of Wheaton College helped Yaghjian raise money to travel home and vote in the election, as, at the time, South Carolina law only permitted military personnel to request absentee ballots. Yaghjian married Robert G. Waites in 1965. The couple raised two children.

Candy Waites was president of the League of Women Voters of Columbia/Richland County from 1973 to 1976. She ran for a seat on the Richland County Council for the first time in 1976. Waites remained a county council member for twelve years. Subsequently, Waites was nominated by the Democratic Party and won a June 1988 special election against Republican candidate Ray Rossi in the South Carolina House of Representatives's 75th district. Waites faced Rossi in the November general elections and secured a full term in office. As a legislator, Waites was supportive of environmental regulations. In 1989, she filed a complaint with the state ethics board regarding a contract between the state government and architectural firm R. Phil Roof to build a new state prison. Waites opted not to run for another full term as state legislator in 1994, because her district was subject to reapportionment. After leaving public office, Waites served as lecturer of political science and an associate dean of the Leadership Institute at Columbia College from 1993 to 1999. During her tenure at Columbia, Waites earned a master's degree in public administration at the University of South Carolina in 1997. Between 1999 and 2003, Waites was director of the division of children's services for the South Carolina Governor's Office. She then returned to Columbia College as director of the Leadership Institute, serving until 2010.

References

1943 births
Wheaton College (Massachusetts) alumni
Politicians from Columbia, South Carolina
Politicians from New York City
Women state legislators in South Carolina
Living people
20th-century American women politicians
20th-century American politicians
Democratic Party members of the South Carolina House of Representatives
University of South Carolina alumni
American people of Armenian descent
American people of Scottish descent
County council members in South Carolina
Columbia College (South Carolina) faculty